Eremiomyces is a fungal genus within the Pezizaceae family. This is a monotypic genus, containing the single species Eremiomyces echinulatus.

References

Pezizaceae
Monotypic Ascomycota genera
Pezizales genera